The 2013 Austrian Darts Open was the fourth of eight PDC European Tour events on the 2013 PDC Pro Tour. The tournament took place at the Arena Nova in Wiener Neustadt, Austria, from 31 May–2 June 2013. It featured a field of 64 players and £100,000 in prize money, with £20,000 going to the winner.

Michael van Gerwen won his second European Tour title by beating Mervyn King 6–3 in the final.

Prize money

Qualification
The top 32 players from the PDC ProTour Order of Merit on the 29 April 2013 automatically qualified for the event. The remaining 32 places went to players from three qualifying events - 20 from the UK Qualifier (held in Wigan on 3 May), eight from the European Qualifier and four from the Host Nation Qualifier (both held at the venue in Wiener Neustadt on 30 May).

Simon Whitlock, Adrian Lewis and Phil Taylor all withdrew before the event started. Two additional places were therefore available in the European Qualifier and one extra place was available in the Home Nation Qualifier.

1–32

UK Qualifier
  Terry Temple (first round)
  Jamie Lewis (first round)
  Kevin McDine (third round)
  Paul Barham (first round)
  Steve Beaton (semi-finals)
  Ross Smith (third round)
  Nigel Heydon (second round)
  Alan Tabern (first round)
  Steve West (second round)
  Steve Hine (first round)
  John Bowles (first round)
  Darren Webster (first round)
  Joe Murnan (first round)
  John Henderson (second round)
  Jim Walker (second round)
  Dennis Smith (quarter-finals)
  Peter Hudson (first round)
  Kevin Dowling (second round)
  Campbell Jackson (first round)
  Joe Cullen (quarter-finals)

European Qualifier
  Peter Martin (withdrew)
  Max Hopp (first round)
  Roland Scholten (first round)
  Bernd Roith (first round)
  Vincent van der Voort (first round)
  Tomas Seyler (second round)
  Ronny Huybrechts (first round)
  Antonio Alcinas (first round)
  Leon de Geus (first round)
  Jelle Klaasen (quarter-finals)

Host Nation Qualifier
  Andreas Pur (first round)
  Günther Rimser (first round)
  Mensur Suljović (first round)
  Christian Kallinger (first round)
  Erwin Freidl (first round)

Draw

References

2013 PDC European Tour
2013 in Austrian sport